Canidia mexicana is a species of longhorn beetles of the subfamily Lamiinae. It was described by Thomson in 1860, and is known from central Mexico.

References

Beetles described in 1860
Acanthocinini